Larisa Neiland and Jana Novotná were the defending champions, but Novotná opted to rest after competing consecutively in the previous two weeks, winning the title at San Diego and finishing as runner-up at Manhattan Beach. Neiland teamed up with Gabriela Sabatini and lost in the semifinals to Pam Shriver and Elizabeth Smylie.

Meredith McGrath and Arantxa Sánchez Vicario won the title by defeating Shriver and Smylie 2–6, 6–2, 6–4 in the final.

Seeds
The first four seeds received a bye into the second round.

Draw

Finals

Top half

Bottom half

References

External links
 Official results archive (ITF)
 Official results archive (WTA)

1994 WTA Tour
1994 Canadian Open (tennis)